The French Provisional Government of 1814 held office during the transitional period between the defeat of Napoleon followed by the surrender of Paris on 31 March 1814 and the appointment on 13 May 1814 of the Government of the first Bourbon restoration by King Louis XVIII of France.

Formation of the government

On 31 March 1814 Marshal Auguste de Marmont surrendered Paris to the Emperor Alexander I of Russia, who entered the city the same day. Prince Talleyrand placed his house at the Emperor's disposal.
The Senate met on 1 April 1814 and, in accordance with the views expressed by Alexander I, decreed the formation of a provisional government headed by Talleyrand.
The members of the Provisional Government were:

 Charles Maurice de Talleyrand-Périgord (President)
 Pierre Riel de Beurnonville
 François de Jaucourt
 Emmerich Joseph de Dalberg
 François-Xavier-Marc-Antoine de Montesquiou-Fézensac

On 2 April the Senate declared that Napoleon and his family had been deposed.

Ministers

The Provisional Government announced the appointment of commissaires to head the ministries on 3 April 1814. They were:

Foreign Affairs: Antoine de Laforêt
Justice: Pierre Paul Nicolas Henrion de Pansey
Interior: Jacques Claude Beugnot
War: Pierre Dupont de l'Étang
Finance, Commerce and Industry: Joseph-Dominique Louis
Navy and Colonies: Pierre-Victor Malouet
Police: Jules Anglès
Secretary-general: Dupont de Nemours

Events

The Provisional Government drafted a constitution, which was approved unanimously by the Senate on 6 April 1814. 
It announced the Bourbon Restoration, declaring that Louis XVIII of France was king.
Napoleon, who had retired to Fontainebleau, signed an act of abdication on 11 April 1814.
He left Fontainebleau on 20 April 1814 for exile on the island of Elba.
On 12 April 1814 Charles, Count of Artois, the king's brother, entered Paris. 
He was declared Lieutenant General of the kingdom on 14 April 1814.
Louis XVIII had been watching events from Hartwell House in England. 
On 24 April 1814 he landed at Calais and on 3 April 1814 made a triumphal entry into Paris.
He announced his government on 13 May 1814.

References
Citations

Sources

French governments
1814 establishments in France
1814 disestablishments in France
Cabinets established in 1814
Cabinets disestablished in 1814
Provisional governments